Summing localization occurs when two or more coherent sound waves arrive within a limited time interval and only one sound sensation is perceived. If the time variations are smaller than 1 ms, the time and level variations of all sound sources contribute to the direction of the perceived sound. The resulting auditory event is called a phantom source.

Summing localization is the basis of stereophony.

See also
Precedence effect

References 

Jens Blauert "Spatial Hearing", The MIT Press; Rev Sub edition (October 2, 1996)
On the Localisation in the superimposed Soundfield by Günther Theile

Sound